Civil–military relations (Civ-Mil or CMR) describes the relationship between military organizations and civil society, military organizations and other government bureaucracies, and leaders and the military. CMR incorporates a diverse, often normative field, which moves within and across management, social science and policy scales. More narrowly, it describes the relationship between the civil authority of a given society and its military authority. "The goal of any state is to harness military professional power to serve vital national security interests, while guarding against the misuse of power that can threaten the well-being of its people." Studies of civil-military relations often rest on a normative assumption that it is preferable to have the ultimate responsibility for a country's strategic decision-making to lie in the hands of the civilian political leadership (i.e. civilian control of the military) rather than a military (a military dictatorship).

A paradox lies at the center of traditional civil-military relations theory. The military, an institution designed to protect the polity, must also be strong enough to threaten the society it serves. A military take-over or coup is an example where this balance is used to change the government.  Ultimately, the military must accept that civilian authorities have the "right to be wrong".  In other words, they may be responsible for carrying out a policy decision they disagree with. Civilian supremacy over the military is a complicated matter. The rightness or wrongness of a policy or decision can be ambiguous. Civilian decision makers may be impervious to corrective information. The relationship between civilian authorities and military leaders must be worked out in practice.

The principal problem they examine, however, is empirical: to explain how civilian control over the military is established and maintained. In the broader sense it examines the ways society and military intersect or interact and includes topics such as the integration of veterans into society, methods used to recruit and retain service members, and the fairness and efficacy of these systems, the integration of minorities, women, and the LGBT community into the military, the behavior and consequences of private contractors, the role of culture in military organizations, voting behavior of soldiers and veterans, and the gaps in policy preferences between civilians and soldiers.

While generally not considered a separate academic area of study in and of itself, it involves scholars and practitioners from many fields and specialties. Apart from political science and sociology, Civ-Mil (CMR) draws upon such diverse fields as law, philosophy, area studies, psychology, cultural studies, anthropology, economics, history, diplomatic history, journalism, and the military, among others. It involves study and discussion of a diverse range of issues including but not limited to: civilian control of the military, military professionalism, war, civil-military operations, military institutions, and other related subjects. International in scope, civil-military relations involves discussion and research from across the world. The theoretical discussion can include non-state actors as well as more traditional nation-states. Other research involves discerning the details of military political attitudes, voting behavior, and the potential impact on and interaction with democratic society as well as military families.

History

The history of civil-military relations can be traced to the writings of Sun Tzu and Carl von Clausewitz, both of whom argued that military organizations were primarily the servants of the state.

Concerns about a growing militarism in society, largely coming from the experiences of the first half of the twentieth century, engendered an examination into the impact of military organizations within society.

The ramifications of the Cold War, specifically the American decision to maintain a large standing army for the first time in its history, led to concerns about whether such a large military structure could be effectively maintained by a liberal democracy. Samuel P. Huntington and Morris Janowitz published the seminal books on the subject which effectively brought civil-military relations into academia, particularly in political science and sociology.

Despite the peculiarly American impetus for Huntington's and Janowitz's writing, their theoretical arguments have been used in the study of other national civil-military studies. For example, Ayesha Ray used the ideas of Huntington in her book about Indian civil-military relations.  In The Man on Horseback, Samuel E. Finer countered some of Huntington's arguments and assumption and offered a look into the civil-military relationships in the under-developed world. Finer observed that many governments do not have the administrative skills to efficiently govern which may open opportunities for military intervention—opportunities that are not as likely in more developed countries.

The increased incidence of military coups d'état since World War II, particularly in the 1960s and 1970s, brought about a growing interest in academic and journalistic circles in studying the nature of such coups. Political upheaval in Africa led to military take-overs in Dahomey, Togo, Congo, and Uganda, to mention just a few. Political unrest in South America, which involved military coups in Bolivia (189 military coups in its first 169 years of existence), Chile, Argentina, Brazil, Paraguay, Peru, and Uruguay, was largely a result of forces attempting to stem the increasing influence of left-wing and communist led uprisings. The 2006 military coup in Thailand engendered continued interest in this area.

The end of the Cold War led to new debate about to the proper role of the military in society, both in the United States and in the former Soviet Union. However, as before, much of the discussion revolved around whether the power of the state was in decline and whether an appropriate level of civilian control was being brought to bear on the military.

Professional organization and journal

The principal professional organization for civil-military scholars is the Inter-University Seminar on Armed Forces and Society (IUS). The IUS sponsors Armed Forces & Society: An Interdisciplinary Journal which publishes articles on civil-military relations, force diversity, veterans, military families, privatization, officer training, recruitment and retention, public opinion, conflict management, unit cohesion, ethics, and peacemaking. The journal Armed Forces & Society is located at Texas State University and is currently edited by Patricia M. Shields. The Inter-University Seminar on Armed Forces and Society and the journal are international in scope. They have a conference every other year in odd years. The 2017 conference was held in Reston VA.

The topics of research in Civil-Military Relations are varied as evidenced by recent scholarship in such topics as:

 Health of the force
 Military Cohesion
 Civil-Military Relations Russia
 Special Forces 
 Veterans
 Ethics, Professionalism and Leadership
 Military Families
 Women in the Military 
 LGBTQ Issues.

Major theoretical discussions in civil-military relations

In 1945, the United States began a demobilization of the massive military force that had been built up during World War II. Strong public and bipartisan pressure succeeded in forcing the government to bring American soldiers home and to reduce the size of the armed forces quickly. Strikes and even some rioting by military personnel at overseas bases in January 1946 pressured President Harry S. Truman to continue the process despite growing concern about the Soviet Union and an increasing recognition that the United States was not going to be able to retreat into the isolationism of the pre-war years. Attempts in the United States Congress to continue conscription to provide a trained reserve as a replacement for a large standing military force failed and, in 1947, the World War II draft law expired.

By the summer of 1950, the armed forces of the United States had fewer than 1.5 million personnel on active duty, down from a high of 12 million in 1945. By the next year, however, in response to North Korea's invasion of South Korea, the size of the U.S. military was again on the rise, doubling to more than 3.2 million personnel. Reaching a high of 3.6 million in 1953, the total number of personnel on active duty in the U.S. military never again dropped below two million during the 40-plus years of the Cold War. After the fall of the Berlin Wall and the collapse of the Soviet Union, the size of the active-duty force had, by 1999, dropped to just under 1.4 million personnel. As of February 28, 2009, a total of 1,398,378 men and women remain on active duty in the U.S. armed forces.

The size of the U.S. military in the latter half of the twentieth century, unprecedented in peacetime, caused concern in some circles, primarily as to the potential effect of maintaining such a large force in a democratic society. Some predicted disaster and were concerned with the growing militarization of American society. These writers were quite sure that a distinctly military culture was inherently dangerous to a non-militaristic liberal society. Others warned that the ascendancy of the military establishment would fundamentally change American foreign policy and would weaken the intellectual fabric of the country. However, most of the arguments were less apocalyptic and settled along two tracks. The two tracks are highlighted, respectively, by Samuel P. Huntington's Soldier and the State and Morris Janowitz's The Professional Soldier.

The debate focused primarily on the nature of the relationship between the civilian and military worlds. There was widespread agreement that there were two distinct worlds and that they were fundamentally different from one another. The argument was over how best to ensure that the two could coexist without endangering liberal democracy.

Institutional theory

In his seminal 1957 book on civil-military relations, The Soldier and the State, Samuel P. Huntington described the differences between the two worlds as a contrast between the attitudes and values held by military personnel, mostly conservative, and those held by civilians, mostly liberal. Each world consisted of a separate institution with its own operative rules and norms. The military's function was furthermore inherently different from that of the civilian world. Given a more conservative military world which was illiberal in many aspects, it was necessary to find a method of ensuring that the liberal civilian world would be able to maintain its dominance over the military world. Huntington's answer to this problem was "military professionalism."

Huntington focused his study on the officer corps. He first defined a profession and explained that enlisted personnel, while certainly part of the military world, are not, strictly speaking, professionals. He relegated them to the role of tradesmen or skilled craftsmen, necessary but not professionals in his definition of the term. It was professional military officers, not the enlisted technicians of the trade of violence, or even the part-time or amateur reserve officers extant in the mid-1950s (as opposed to the near "part-time 'regular'" status characterizing reserve officers with extensive active duty experience, professional military education, and active combat experience in the post-Gulf War period), who would be the key to controlling the military world.

Professionalizing the military, or at least the officer corps, which is the decision-making authority within the military world, emphasizes the useful aspects of that institution such as discipline, structure, order, and self-sacrifice. It also isolates the corps in a specialized arena in which the military professionals would be recognized as experts in the use of force. As recognized experts not subject to the interference of the civilian world, the military's officer corps would willingly submit itself to civil authority. In Huntington's words, such an arrangement maintained a "focus on a politically neutral, autonomous, and professional officer corps."

In order for the civilian authority to maintain control, it needed to have a way to direct the military without unduly infringing on the prerogatives of the military world and thus provoking a backlash. Civilian leadership would decide the objective of any military action but then leave it to the military world to decide upon the best way of achieving the objective. The problem facing civilian authority, then, is in deciding on the ideal amount of control. Too much control over the military could result in a force too weak to defend the nation, resulting in failure on the battlefield. Too little control would create the possibility of a coup, i.e., failure of the government.

Huntington's answer to the control dilemma was "objective civilian control." This was in contrast to "subjective control," in which direction would be more intrusive and detailed. To put it simply, the more "objective civilian control," the more military security. Civilian control, then, is the independent variable for the subsequent dependent variable of military effectiveness.

If civilian control is the critical variable for military effectiveness, it raises the question of how civilian control is then to be determined. Huntington identified two shaping forces or imperatives for civilian control – (1) functional and (2) societal. He broke the societal imperative into two components, ideology and structure. By ideology, he meant a world-view or paradigm: liberal anti-military, conservative pro-military, fascist pro-military, and Marxist anti-military. By structure, he meant the legal-constitutional framework that guided political affairs generally and civil-military affairs specifically.

According to Huntington and early studies of civil-military relationships, it is considered that effective civil-military relations should be in the form of objective civilian control over their armed forces. This control is indicated by the following factors; (1) the military's adoption of professional ethos and their recognition of boundaries of professional roles, (2) effective subordination of the military to civilian political leadership that formulates strategic directives on foreign and military policies, (3) recognition and approval from political leaders to the professional authorities and autonomy of the military and (4) minimal intervention of the military in politics and of politicians in military affairs.

If Huntington's imperatives are the independent variables, then the variable of civilian control becomes, in turn, an explanatory variable for military security. However, Huntington says that both societal imperatives, ideology, and structure, are unchanging, at least in the American case. If that is the case, then the functional imperative is fully explanatory for changes in civilian control and subsequently military security. In short, if external threats are low, liberal ideology "extirpates" or eliminates military forces. If external threats are high, liberal ideology produces a "transmutation" effect that will re-create the military in accordance with liberalism, but in such a form that it will lose its "peculiarly military characteristics." Transmutation will work for short periods, such as to fight a war, but will not, over time, assure military security. This appears to explain well the pattern of American militarization and demobilization, at least until the initiation of the Cold War.

With the understanding that the rise of the Soviet Union created a long-term threat, Huntington concluded that the liberal society of the United States would fail to create adequate military forces to ensure security over the long term. The only circumstance he could foresee that would permit adequate military security was for the United States to change the societal imperative. "The tension between the demands of military security and the values of American liberalism can, in the long run, be relieved only by the weakening of the security threat or the weakening of liberalism." The only way the United States could adequately provide security in the face of a long-term threat such as the Soviet Union, in other words, was for American society to become more conservative.

Risa Brooks argues that the health of civil-military relations is best judged by whether there is a (i) preference divergence between military and political leaders, and (ii) whether there is a power imbalance. She argues that the healthiest arrangement of civil-military relations is when the preferences between military and political leaders is low, and political leaders have a dominant power advantage. She argues that the worst kind of civil-military relations is when there is high preference divergence, as well as a power balance between the military and political leaders.

Convergence theory
The other principal thread within the civil-military theoretical debate was that generated in 1960 by Morris Janowitz in The Professional Soldier. Janowitz agreed with Huntington that separate military and civilian worlds existed, but differed from his predecessor regarding the ideal solution for preventing danger to liberal democracy. Since the military world as he saw it was fundamentally conservative, it would resist change and not adapt as rapidly as the more open and unstructured civilian society to changes in the world. Thus, according to Janowitz, the military would benefit from exactly what Huntington argued against – outside intervention.

Janowitz introduced a theory of convergence, arguing that the military, despite the extremely slow pace of change, was in fact changing even without external pressure. Convergence theory postulated either a civilianization of the military or a militarization of society  However, despite this convergence, Janowitz insisted that the military world would retain certain essential differences from the civilian and that it would remain recognizably military in nature.

Janowitz agreed with Huntington that, because of the fundamental differences between the civilian and military worlds, clashes would develop which would diminish the goal of civilian control of the military. His answer was to ensure that convergence occurred, thus ensuring that the military world would be imbued with the norms and expectations of the society that created it. He encouraged use of conscription, which would bring a wide variety of individuals into the military. He also encouraged the use of more Reserve Officer Training Corps (ROTC) programs at colleges and universities to ensure that the military academies did not have a monopoly on the type of officer, particularly the senior general officer and flag officer leadership positions, in the military services. He specifically encouraged the development of ROTC programs in the more elite universities, so that the broader influences of society would be represented by the officer corps. The more such societal influences present within the military culture, the smaller the attitudinal differences between the two worlds and the greater the chance of civilians maintaining control over the military. Janowitz, like Huntington, believed that the civilian and military worlds were different from one another; while Huntington developed a theory to control the difference, Janowitz developed a theory to diminish the difference.

In response to Huntington's position on the functional imperative, Janowitz concluded that in the new nuclear age, the United States was going to have to be able to deliver both strategic deterrence and an ability to participate in limited wars. Such a regime, new in American history, was going to require a new military self-conception, the constabulary concept: "The military establishment becomes a constabulary force when it is continuously prepared to act, committed to the minimum use of force, and seeks viable international relations, rather than victory..." Under this new concept of the military establishment, distinctions between war and peace are more difficult to draw. The military, instead of viewing itself as a fire company to be called out in emergency, would then be required to imagine itself in the role of a police force, albeit on the international level rather than domestically. The role of the civilian elite would be to interact closely with the military elite so as to ensure a new and higher standard of professional military education, one that would ensure that military professionals were more closely attuned to the ideals and norms of civilian society.

Institutional/occupational hypothesis
Charles Moskos developed the institutional/occupational (I/O) hypothesis as a means to promote comparative historical studies of military organization and military change. This hypothesis evolved into the Postmodern Military Model, which helped predict the course of civil-military relations after the end of the Cold War. The I/O hypothesis argued that the military was moving away from an institutional model towards one that was more occupational in nature. An institutional model presents the military as an organization highly divergent from civilian society while an occupational model presents the military more convergent with civilian structures. While Moskos did not propose that the military was ever "entirely separate or entirely coterminous with civilian society", the use of a scale helped better to highlight the changing interface between the armed forces and society.

Agency theory
The Vietnam War opened deep arguments about civil-military relations that continue to exert powerful influences today. One centered on a contention within military circles that the United States lost the war because of unnecessary civilian meddling in military matters. It was argued that the civilian leadership failed to understand how to use military force and improperly restrained the use of force in achieving victory. Among the first to analyze the war critically was Harry Summers, who used Clausewitz as his theoretical basis. He argued that the principal reason for the loss of the Vietnam War was a failure on the part of the political leadership to understand the goal, which was victory. The Army, always successful on the battlefield, ultimately did not achieve victory because it was misused and misunderstood. Summers argued that the conduct of the war violated many classical principals as described by Clausewitz, thereby contributing to failure. He ended his analysis with a "quintessential strategic lesson learned": that the Army must become "masters of the profession of arms," thus reinforcing an idea along the lines of Huntington's argument for strengthening military professionalism.

H.R. McMaster observed that it was easier for officers in the Gulf War to connect national policy to the actual fighting than was the case during Vietnam. He concluded that the Vietnam War had actually been lost in Washington, D.C., before any fighting occurred, due to a fundamental failure on the part of the civilian and military actors involved to argue the issues adequately. McMaster, who urged a more direct debate between civilians and the military on defense policy and actions, and Summers, who argued for a clear separation between civilians and the military, both pointed out controversies over the proper roles of civilian and military leaders.

Despite those controversies and the apparent lessons learned from the Vietnam War, some theorists recognized a significant problem with Huntington's theory insofar as it appears to question the notion of a separate, apolitical professional military. While there is little argument that separate civilian and military worlds exist, there is significant debate about the proper interaction between the two. As discussed above, Huntington proposed that the ideal arrangement was one whereby civilian political leaders provided objective control to the military leadership and then stepped back to permit the experts in violence to do what was most effective. He further stated that the most dangerous arrangement was one whereby civilian leaders intruded extensively in the military world, creating a situation whereby the military leadership was not politically neutral and security of the nation was thus threatened both by an ineffective military and by provoking the military to avoid taking orders.

Arguably, however, and despite Huntington's urging otherwise, U.S. civilian leadership had been intrusive in its control over the military, not only during the Vietnam War, but also during much of the Cold War. During that time, the military elite had been extensively involved in the politics of defense budgets and management, and yet the United States had managed to emerge successfully from the Cold War. Despite that, none of Huntington's more dire predictions had proven true.

In response to this apparent "puzzle," Peter D. Feaver laid out an agency theory of civil-military relations, which he argued should replace Huntington's institutional theory. Taking a rationalist approach, he used a principal-agent framework, drawn from microeconomics, to explore how actors in a superior position influence those in a subordinate role. He used the concepts of "working" and "shirking" to explain the actions of the subordinate. In his construct, the principal is the civilian leadership that has the responsibility of establishing policy. The agent is the military that will work – carry out the designated task – or shirk – evading the principal's wishes and carrying out actions that further the military's own interests. Shirking at its worst may be disobedience, but Feaver includes such things as "foot-dragging" and leaks to the press.

The problem for the principal is how to ensure that the agent is doing what the principal wants done. Agency theory predicts that if the costs of monitoring the agent are low, the principal will use intrusive methods of control. Intrusive methods include, for the executive branch, such things as inspections, reports, reviews of military plans, and detailed control of the budget, and for Congress, committee oversight hearings and requiring routine reports. For the military agent, if the likelihood that shirking will be detected by the civilian principal is high or if the perceived costs of being punished are too high, the likelihood of shirking is low.

Feaver argued that his theory was different from other theories or models in that it was purely deductive, based on democratic theory rather than on anecdotal evidence, and better enabled analysis of day-to-day decisions and actions on the part of the civilian and military leadership. It operated at the intersection of Huntington's institutional approach and Janowitz's sociological point of view. Huntington concentrated on the relationship between civilian leadership and the military qua institution while Janowitz focused on the relationship of the military qua individuals to American society. Agency theory provided a link between the two enabling an explanation of how civil-military relations work on a day-to-day basis. Specifically, agency theory would predict that the result of a regime of intrusive monitoring by the civilian leadership combined with shirking on the part of the military would result in the highest levels of civil-military conflict. Feaver suggested that post-Cold War developments had so profoundly reduced the perceived costs of monitoring and reduced the perceived expectation of punishment that the gap between what civilians ask the military to do and what the military would prefer to do had increased to unprecedented levels.

Concordance theory
After observing that most civil-military theory assumes that the civilian and military worlds must necessarily be separate, both physically and ideologically, Rebecca L. Schiff offered a new theory—Concordance—as an alternative. One of the key questions in Civil-Military Relations (CMR) theory has always been to determine under what conditions the military will intervene in the domestic politics of the nation. Most scholars agree with the theory of objective civilian control of the military (Huntington), which focuses on the separation of civil and military institutions. Such a view concentrates and relies heavily on the U.S. case, from an institutional perspective, and especially during the Cold War period. Schiff provides an alternative theory, from both institutional and cultural perspectives, that explains the U.S. case as well as several non-U.S. civil-military relations case studies.

While concordance theory does not preclude a separation between the civilian and military worlds, it does not require such a state to exist. She argues that three societal institutions—(1) the military, (2) political elites, and (3) the citizenry must aim for a cooperative arrangement and some agreement on four primary indicators:

 Social composition of the officer corps.
 The political decision-making process.
 The method of recruiting military personnel.
 The style of the military.

If agreement occurs among the three partners with respect to the four indicators, domestic military intervention is less likely to occur. In her book, The Military and Domestic Politics, she applied her theory to six international historical cases studies: U.S., post–Second World War period; American Post-Revolutionary Period (1790–1800); Israel (1980–90); Argentina (1945–55); India post-Independence and 1980s; Pakistan (1958–69).

Concordance theory has been applied to emerging democracies, which have more immediate threat of coups.

Other civil-military relations issues

Liberal theory and the American Founding Fathers

At the heart of civil-military relations is the problem of how a civilian government can control and remain safe from the military institution it created for its own protection. A military force that is strong enough to do what is asked of it must not also pose a danger to the controlling government. This poses the paradox that "because we fear others we create an institution of violence to protect us, but then we fear the very institution we created for protection".

The solution to this problem throughout most of American history was to keep its standing army small, relying on augmentation from militias (the predecessor of modern-day Reserve forces, to include the National Guard) and volunteers. While armed forces were built up during wartime, the pattern after every war up to and including World War II was to demobilize quickly and return to something approaching pre-war force levels. However, with the advent of the Cold War in the 1950s, the need to create and maintain a sizable peacetime military force engendered new concerns of militarism and about how such a large force would affect civil-military relations in the United States. For the first time in American history, the problem of civil-military relations would have to be managed during peacetime.

The men who wrote the Constitution of the United States were fearful of large standing armies, legislatures that had too much power, and perhaps most of all, a powerful executive who might be able to wage war on his own authority. All were objects of concern because of the dangers each posed to liberal democracy and a free citizenry. While it is often impossible to "gauge accurately the intent of the Framers", it is nevertheless important to understand the motivations and concerns of the writers with respect to the appropriate relationship between civil and military authority. The Federalist Papers provide a helpful view of how they understood the relationship between civil authority, as represented by the executive branch and the legislature, and military authority.

In Federalist No. 8, Alexander Hamilton worried that maintaining a large standing army would be a dangerous and expensive undertaking. In his principal argument for the ratification of the proposed constitution, he argued that only by maintaining a strong union could the new country avoid such a pitfall. Using the European experience as a negative example and the British experience as a positive one, he presented the idea of a strong nation protected by a navy with no need of a standing army. The implication was that control of a large military force is, at best, difficult and expensive, and at worst invites war and division. He foresaw the necessity of creating a civilian government that kept the military at a distance.

James Madison, another writer of several of the Federalist Papers, expressed his concern about a standing military in comments before the Constitutional Convention in June 1787:

In time of actual war, great discretionary powers are constantly given to the Executive Magistrate. Constant apprehension of War, has the same tendency to render the head too large for the body. A standing military force, with an overgrown Executive, will not long be safe companions to liberty. The means of defense against foreign danger, have been always the instruments of tyranny at home. Among the Romans it was a standing maxim to excite a war, whenever a revolt was apprehended. Throughout all Europe, the armies kept up under the pretext of defending, have enslaved the people.

The United States Constitution placed considerable limitations on the legislature. Coming from a tradition of legislative superiority in government, many were concerned that the proposed Constitution would place so many limitations on the legislature that it would become impossible for such a body to prevent an executive from starting a war. Hamilton argued in Federalist No. 26 that it would be equally as bad for a legislature to be unfettered by any other agency and that restraints would actually be more likely to preserve liberty. James Madison, in Federalist No. 47, continued Hamilton's argument that distributing powers among the various branches of government would prevent any one group from gaining so much power as to become unassailable. In Federalist No. 48, however, Madison warned that while the separation of powers is important, the departments must not be so far separated as to have no ability to control the others.

Finally, in Federalist No. 51, Madison argued that to create a government that relied primarily on the good nature of the incumbent to ensure proper government was folly. Institutions must be in place to check incompetent or malevolent leaders. Most importantly, no single branch of government ought to have control over any single aspect of governing. Thus, all three branches of government must have some control over the military, and the system of checks and balances maintained among the other branches would serve to help control the military.

Hamilton and Madison thus had two major concerns: (1) the detrimental effect on liberty and democracy of a large standing army and (2) the ability of an unchecked legislature or executive to take the country to war precipitously. These concerns drove American military policy for the first century and a half of the country's existence. Until the 1950s, the maintenance of a large military force by the United States was an exceptional circumstance and was restricted to times of war. Following every war up to and including World War II, the military was quickly demobilized and reduced to near pre-war levels.

Civilian-military culture gap thesis

Most debates in civil-military relations assumed that a separation between the civilian and military worlds was inevitable and likely necessary. The argument had been over whether to control the gap between the two worlds (Huntington) or to minimize the gap by enacting certain policies (Janowitz). Following the end of the Cold War in 1989, however, the discussion began to focus on the nature of the apparent gap between civilian and military cultures and, more specifically, whether that gap had reached such proportions as to pose a danger to civilian control of the military. Part of the debate was based on the cultural differences between the more liberal civilian society and the conservative military society, and on the recognition that such differences had apparently become more pronounced than in past years.

Alfred Vagts had already begun the discussion from an historical point of view, concentrating on the German/Prussian military experience. He was perhaps most influential with his definition of militarism, which he described as the state of a society that "ranks military institutions and ways above the prevailing attitudes of civilian life and carries the military mentality into the civilian sphere." Louis Smith, whose work pre-dated Huntington's, discussed issues of congressional and judicial control over the military as well as executive civilian control of military matters. However, all that discussion predated a general recognition that the American experience was going to change in the post-World War II era. Once it became apparent that the American military was going to maintain historically high levels of active-duty personnel, concerns about the differences between civilian and military cultures quickly came to the forefront.

The ensuing debate can be generally divided into three periods with different emphases in each. Much of this discussion is taken from a point paper written by Lindsay P. Cohn while a graduate student at Duke University. Her writing has been widely used as a source of simplifying the analysis of the civil-military gap debate. Dr. Cohn is now on the faculty at the United States Naval War College in Newport, R.I.

The first period, roughly beginning with the end of World War II and ending in about 1973 with the end of the military draft in the United States, was primarily concerned with defining civil-military relations, understanding the concept of professionalism, and learning how civilians actually controlled the military. As discussed above, Huntington and Janowitz dominated the debate.

The second period started in about 1973, with the end of conscription and the establishment of the all-volunteer force, and continued until the end of the Cold War. This period was concerned with the supposed lessons of the Vietnam War, how the volunteer force changed the nature of the armed forces, and whether those changes led to wider gaps between military and civilian societies.

The third period, beginning with the end of the Cold War and continuing today, has seen an increasing interest in and concern about the existence of a "civil-military culture gap." The discussion has centered around four questions:
 Whether such a gap exists in the first place? (Most agree it does.)
 What is the nature of the gap?
 Does the gap matter?
 If it does matter, what is causing it? What changes in policy might be required to mitigate negative effects?

What is the nature of the gap?

While the debate surrounding a presumed culture gap between civilian and military societies had continued since at least the early 1950s, it became prominent in the early 1990s with the conclusion of the Cold War. The promised "peace dividend" led to a debate over changes in American national security strategy and what that would mean in terms of the transformation of the mission, composition, and character of the armed forces.

The gap debate revolved around two related concepts:

 The notion of a cultural gap, i.e., the differences in the culture, norms, and values of the military and civilian worlds, and
 The notion of a connectivity gap, i.e., the lack of contact and understanding between them.

Few argued that there was no difference between the two worlds, but some were convinced that the difference itself was the primary danger. Charles Maynes worried that a military force consisting primarily of enlisted personnel from the lower socio-economic classes would ultimately refuse to fight for the goals of the upper classes. Tarr and Roman, on the other hand, were concerned that the similarities between military elites and civilian elites enabled a dangerous politicizing trend among the military. Chivers represented a small number who believed that the differences between the cultures were so small as essentially to be irrelevant.

Reasons for the cultural and connectivity gaps vary widely. The self-selective nature of the All-Volunteer Force is seen by some to have led to the unrepresentative nature of the armed forces One argument, put forward by a Navy Chief of Chaplains, was that the drawdown in the size of the military was exacerbating differences and making the separation between the military and civilian societies potentially even more divisive. He worried that unless an effective dialogue could be maintained between the military and civilian branches of society, especially in the area of ethical decision-making, the American military risked losing the support of society or becoming dangerously militaristic. Others argued that the increase in diversity among military personnel has actually strengthened ties between society and the military, especially those ties weakened by the results of the Vietnam War. Most were persuaded that the societal effects of the Vietnam War remained central to the cultural differences.

One unique view, which does not neatly fall into either of the cultural- or connectivity-gap categories, centers on the organizational differences between the military and civilian societies. This view claims to explain much as to why the military has been or may be used to press ahead of society's norms. This view goes beyond the simpler cultural-gap approach and emphasizes the ability of the military society to control the behavior and attitudes of its members in ways not possible in the more open civilian society, as evidenced by such phenomena as desegregation of the military and inclusion of women in the military.

Why does the gap matter?

Ultimately, the cultural gap matters only if it endangers civilian control of the military or if it reduces the ability of the country to maintain an effective military force. Those who concentrate on the nature of the gap tend not to be concerned about dangerous trends. However, those who are concerned about the lack of understanding between the civilian and military worlds are uniformly convinced that the civil-military relationship in the United States is unhealthy. Specifically, they have voiced concerns about a military that may become openly contemptuous of civilian norms and values and may then feel free to openly question the value of defending such a society. Others worry whether an inexperienced civilian government will undermine the military by ineffective or inappropriate policies, thus threatening U.S. national security.

This debate has generally settled on whether or not the gap is too wide. If too wide, civilian control of the military may be jeopardized due to serious misunderstandings between the two worlds. While most agree that such a gap is to be expected and, in and of itself, is not dangerous, some do concede the aspects of that gap have led directly to misunderstandings between the two worlds. In particular, some have argued that the culture of political conservatism and the apparent increase in partisanship of the officer corps has approached a dangerous limit. Nearly all agree that it is possible for the cultural gap to be either too wide or too narrow, but there is wide disagreement as to where the current situation rests on that continuum. While Elizabeth Kier argues that "structure and function do not determine culture," most agree that a difference between the two is necessary because civilian culture was "incommensurate with military effectiveness."

Correcting the problem

Assuming that a problem exists, many have offered suggestions for narrowing the gap and correcting the problems arising from it. In general, those suggestions are along three lines. The first is that the military must reach out to the civilian world. Given the essentially universal agreement that civilians must control the military, the duty falls upon the military to find ways to talk to civilians, not the other way around. The second is that civilians must articulate a clear vision of what they expect in terms of the military mission. And the final suggestion is that the most practical and effective means of bringing about dialogue and understanding is to be bilateral education, in which both military and civilian elites would jointly attend specialized schools. Such schooling would emphasize military-strategic thinking, American history and political philosophy, military ethics, and the proper relationship between civil and military authority.

Some argue that the root problem is that the military is self-selecting, rendering the culture a self-perpetuating one. Solutions such as the reinstatement of the draft and a European-style national service obligation have been offered. but none appear to have made any progress toward adoption.

Contemporary issues

A  common issue that hinders many civil-military relations is when civil political leaders attempt to resume or gain a certain degree of civilian control after a period of transition, conflict or dictatorship, but do not possess the necessary capacities and commitment to handle defense affairs. What should happen in such transitions is that when military figures begin to be withdrawn from political positions in order to achieve some balance, is that civilian politicians should be taught to deal with policy formulation and given an oversight on the defense sector so as to efficiently replace the former military leaders. However, civilian control over the military, despite the efforts that have been made over the past years, has yet to become institutionalized in many countries.
The challenges that civil-military relations face in many countries, such as Indonesia, center around problems of military culture, overlapping coordination, authority, lack of resources and institutional deficits.
The military cannot continue to be an organization with unmatched institutional reach and political influence, while limiting state capacity, because in doing so it will be evermore challenging for civilian supremacy to take a stance, thus establishing effective civil-military relations. If these problems are not addressed properly, as long as civil-military relations of countries continue to interact within undefined boundaries, without clear subordination and authority and with the constrictions of limited budgets, it is unlikely that countries that still struggle with the concept will achieve a stable and efficient civil-military relationship, something that will continue to damage state capacity and stability.

Civil–military relations in Afghanistan
Researchers from the Overseas Development Institute wrote that 'the belief that development and reconstruction activities are central to security'...'is a central component of western involvement' and that this has been 'highly contentious among aid agencies, perhaps nowhere more so than Afghanistan.'
Their April 2013 paper  includes the following three key messages -

 Stabilisation approaches are likely to continue to present challenges to the aid community’s ability to act according to humanitarian principles in conflict-affected, fragile and postconflict environments. Experiences in Afghanistan highlight significant tension, if not conflict, between stabilisation and internationally recognised guidelines and principles governing civil–military interaction.
 Civil–military dialogue was markedly more effective when it was rooted in International Humanitarian Law (IHL) and strategic argumentation, as with advocacy focused on reducing harm to civilians.
 Aid agencies need to invest more in capacity and training for engaging in civil–military dialogue and, together with donors, seek to generate more objective evidence on the impact of stabilisation approaches.

See also

Articles 

 Defense industry 
 Military-industrial complex
 Intelligence contractor
 War profiteering
 National Defense Industrial Association, which lobbies the United States Congress, advocating for the business interests of the private defense industry.
 Aerospace Industries Association

Notable writers and researchers in civil-military relations

Risa Brooks, Marquette University
James Burk, Texas A&M University
Carl von Clausewitz
Eliot Cohen, Johns Hopkins School of Advanced International Studies (SAIS)
Lindsay P. Cohn, U.S. Naval War College
Jason Dempsey, Columbia University
Erica de Bruin, Hamilton College (Coup-Proofing & Counterbalancing Security Forces)
Michael C. Desch, Notre Dame University
Peter D. Feaver, Duke University (Agency Theory)
Samuel E. Finer
Jim Golby, University of Texas at Austin (Politicization)
Samuel P. Huntington (Institutional Theory)
Donald S. Inbody, Texas State University (Military and Overseas Voting)
Morris Janowitz, University of Chicago (Convergence Theory)
Richard H. Kohn, University of North Carolina at Chapel Hill
Danielle Lupton, Colgate University
Charles Moskos (Institutional/Occupational Hypothesis)*
Abdul Haris Nasution (Indonesian Military General)
Mackubin Thomas Owens, Institute of World Politics
Jonathan M. Powell, University of Central Florida (Coups & Coup-Proofing)
Ayesha Ray, King's College (Pennsylvania) (Indian Civil-Military Relations)
Derek Reveron, U.S. Naval War College
Sam C. Sarkesian
David R. Segal, University of Maryland (Military Sociology)
Mady Wechsler Segal, University of Maryland (Military Sociology - Families)
Patricia M. Shields Editor, Armed Forces & Society, Texas State University
Claire M. Smith, Overseas Vote Foundation
Judith Hicks Stiehm, Florida International University
Sun Tzu
Heidi A. Urben, Georgetown University
Alfred Vagts (Militarism)
John Allen Williams (Loyola University, Chicago)

References

Further reading

Institutional/occupational hypothesis
Moskos, Charles C. (1977) From Institution to Occupation: Trends in Military Organization, Armed Forces & Society, Vol. 4, No. 1
Moskos, Charles C. (1986) Institutional/Occupational Trends in the Armed Forces: An Update, Armed Forces & Society, Vol. 12, No. 3
Janowitz, Morris. (1977) From Institutional to Occupational: The Need for Conceptual Continuity, Armed Forces & Society, Vol. 4, No. 1

Agency theory and concordance theory
Feaver, Peter D. (1998) Crisis as Shirking: An Agency Theory Explanation of the Souring of American Civil-Military Relations, Armed Forces & Society, Vol. 24, No. 3
Sowers, Thomas S. (2005) Beyond the Soldier and the State: Contemporary Operations and Variance in Principal-Agent Relationships, Armed Forces & Society, Vol. 31, No. 3
Schiff, Rebecca L. (1995) Cilvil-Military Relations Reconsidered: A Theory of Concordance, Armed Forces & Society, Vol. 22, No. 1
Schiff, Rebecca L. (2012) Concordance Theory, Target Partnership, and Counter-Insurgency Strategy, Armed Forces & Society, Vol. 38, No. 2

Recruiting and military organization
Levy, Yagil. (2007) The Right to Fight: A Conceptual Framework for the Analysis of Recruitment Policy toward Gays and Lesbians, Armed Forces & Society, Vol. 33, No. 3
Eighmey, John. (2006) Why Do Youth Enlist? Identification of Underlying Themes, Armed Forces & Society, Vol. 32 No. 2

Conscription vs. the all-volunteer force
Janowitz, Morris & Moskos, Charles C. (1979) Five Years of the All-Volunteer Force: 1973-1978, Armed Forces & Society, Vol. 5, No. 2
Janowitz, Morris & Moskos, Charles C. (1974) Radical Composition in the All-Volunteer Force, Armed Forces & Society, Vol. 1, No. 1
Bachman, Jerald G. & Blair, John D. (1975) "Citizen Force" or "Career Force"?: Implications for Ideology in the All-Volunteer Army, Armed Forces & Society, Vol. 2, No. 1

Gender and sexual orientation in the military
Belkin, Aaron. (2008) “Don't Ask, Don't Tell”: Does the Gay Ban Undermine the Military's Reputation?, Armed Forces & Society, Vol. 34, No. 2
Brownson, Connie. (2014) "The Battle for Equivalency: Female US Marines Discuss Sexuality, Physical Fitness, and Military Leadership." Armed Forces & Society. doi: 10.1177/0095327X14523957.
King, Anthony. (2014) "Women Warriors: Female Accession to Ground Combat." Armed Forces & Society. doi: 10.1177/0095327X14532913
Levy, Yagil. (2007) The Right to Fight: A Conceptual Framework for the Analysis of Recruitment Policy toward Gays and Lesbians, Armed Forces & Society, Vol. 33, No. 2
Moradi, Bonnie & Miller, Laura. (2010) Attitudes of Iraq and Afghanistan War Veterans toward Gay and Lesbian Service Members, Armed Forces & Society, Vol. 36, No. 3
Parco, James, Levy, David, and Spears, Sarah. (2014) Transgender Military Personnel in the Post-DADT Repeal Era: A Phenomenological Study. Armed Forces & Society. doi: 10.1177/0095327X14530112.

Civil-military gap
Rahbek-Clemmensen, Jon et al. (2012). Conceptualizing the Civil-Military Gap: A Research Note. Armed Forces & Society Vol. 38, No. 4.
Inbody, Donald S. (2015) The Soldier Vote: War, Politics, and the Ballot in America York: Palgrave-Macmillan.

Privatization
Camacho, Paul. (2010) A Forum on Privatization With Comments on the Relevant Literature Found in Armed Forces & Society. Armed Forces & Society, Vol. 36, No. 4.

External links
Center for Civil Military Relations, Naval Postgraduate School 
Irregular Warfare: New Challenges for Civil Military Relations
Homeland Security and U.S. Civil Military Relations
The Limits of American Power and Civil-Military Relations: A Framework For Discussion
American Civil-Military Relations: New Issues, Enduring Problems
Civil-Military Relations in Afghanistan
Colombia: Civil-Military Relations in the Midst of War 
Civil-Military Relations and the 2007 Elections in Pakistan: Impact on the Regional Security Environment
Civil-Military Relations in a Neo-Kantian World, 1886–1992
Civil-Military Relations in Latin America: The Hedgehog and the Fox Revisited
Civil-military Relations and Political Stability
Civil-Military Relations in Emerging Democracies as Found in the Articles of Armed Forces & Society
Third Generation Civil-Military Relations and the ‘New Revolution in Military Affairs’
 Lawrence Sondhaus: Civilian and Military Power, in: 1914-1918-online. International Encyclopedia of the First World War.

Blogs
CivMilBlog
Coup Proof

 
Political science theories
Military sociology